£$€ is a nickname for the following:
 London School of Economics, a public research university located in London, England
 London Stock Exchange, a stock exchange located in the City of London, England